Harish Shah (7 October 1943 – 7 July 2020) was an Indian Film Producer, Director and Writer, known for his work on Mere Jeevan Saathi featuring Rajesh Khanna and Tanuja, Kaala Sona featuring Feroz Khan and Parveen Babi, Ram Tere Kitne Naam featuring Sanjeev Kumar and Rekha, Zalzala featuring Dharmendra and Shatrughan Sinha, Ab Insaf Hoga featuring Mithun Chakraborty and Jaal: The Trap featuring Sunny Deol and Tabu. He died on 7 July 2020 due to throat cancer.

Filmography

Producer, director

References

Further reading

External links 
 

2020 deaths
Film producers from Mumbai
Hindi-language film directors
1943 births
Film directors from Mumbai
Hindi film producers
Deaths from throat cancer